František Chalupa (1828–1887) was a Czech painter and illustrator. As a painter he focused exclusively on landscape and architecture, almost always from the Czech Republic.  His illustrations regularly appeared in magazines. At the end of his life he engaged in Renaissance composition ornaments. His last work was a painting of a windmill in Bautzen.

See also
List of Czech painters

References

1828 births
1887 deaths
19th-century Czech painters
Czech male painters
19th-century Czech male artists